A rescue robot is a robot designed to aid in the search and rescue of humans. They may assist rescue efforts by searching, mapping, removing rubble, delivering supplies, providing medical treatment or evacuating casualties.

Rescue robots were used in the rescue and response efforts to the September 11 attacks, the Fukushima Daiichi nuclear disaster and the 2016 Amatrice earthquake, albeit with questionable success. There are several projects, such as TRADR and SHERPA, dedicated to further developing rescue robot technology.

Use Cases

9/11 
Rescue robots were used in the search for victims and survivors after the September 11 attacks in New York.

During September 11 disasters rescue robots were first really tested. They were sent into the rubble to look for survivors and bodies. The robots had trouble working in the rubble of the World Trade Center and were constantly getting stuck or broken. Since then many new ideas have been formed about rescue robots. Engineers and scientists are trying to change the shapes of the robots and take them from wheels to no wheels. “Strong government funding and support is needed if search and rescued robots are to see widespread use in fewer than 14 years.” This means that without the help of government the technology for these devices are not available or they cost too much. These robots are very important in disaster scenarios and are hopefully taking a change for the better.

Fukushima Daiichi nuclear disaster

Amatrice Post-Earthquake

Robots

Ground

Aerial

Marine

Bio-inspired 

 People like Daniel Goldman, a biophysicist at Georgia Tech, has started building a robot that Piore says “is less like an ATV and more like a sandfish lizard”. Goldman has been spending a lot of time researching and studying the movements of sandfish lizards and trying to develop that into his own robotic idea. Piore states that his robot will be able to “burrow deeper or snake its way back to the surface”.  just like a sandfish lizard. This will be helpful in many disaster scenarios. Goldman is trying to develop this robot to be able to maneuver through such terrain as rubble, like in the World Trade Center disaster.
 Murphy states that most rescue robots are not tested in real life situations and more in a situation that the robot can handle. The possible solutions to these problems are what an associate professor of robotics- Howie Choset, is working on. Choset is working on building a “snake robot”. These snake robots are “thin, legless devices with multiple joints”. These snake robots will be used to go places where normal wheeled robots cannot go. The technology still needs some work and the trials they are going through with them aren’t going perfect. Most tests and studies are helping Choset out and are improving these snake robots. “More animal studies would help” says Choset. The robot is based on snakes and their movements, but considering that snakes are made up of 200 bones and the robot is made up of 15 links, there are problems in functionality.

Search and Rescue Projects

TRADR  

Using a proven-in-practice user-centric design methodology, TRADR develops novel science and technology for human-robot teams to assist in urban search and rescue disaster response efforts, which stretch over multiple sorties in missions that may take several days or weeks. The novel technology makes the experience during robot-assisted response to an emergency persistent. Various kinds of robots collaborate with human team members to explore or search the disaster environment, and gather physical samples from the incident site. Throughout this collaborative effort, TRADR enables the team to gradually develop its understanding of the disaster area over multiple, possibly asynchronous sorties (persistent environment models), to improve team members’ understanding of how to work in the area (persistent multi-robot action models), and to improve team-work (persistent human-robot teaming). TRADR focuses on an industrial accident scenario, but the technology is equally applicable for using robots in other disaster, emergency and urban search and rescue (USAR) scenarios, such as earthquake relief, as the TRADR deployment of robots in Amatrice, Italy, on September 1, 2016 shows.

SHERPA 

The goal of SHERPA is to develop a mixed ground and aerial robotic platform to support search and rescue activities in a real-world hostile environment like the alpine scenario.

The technological platform and the alpine rescuing scenario are the occasion to address a number of research topics about cognition and control pertinent to the call.

What makes the project potentially very rich from a scientific viewpoint is the heterogeneity and the capabilities to be owned by the different actors of the SHERPA system: the "human" rescuer is the "busy genius", working in team with the ground vehicle, as the "intelligent donkey", and with the aerial platforms, i.e. the "trained wasps" and "patrolling hawks". Indeed, the research activity focuses on how the "busy genius" and the "SHERPA animals" interact and collaborate with each other, with their own features and capabilities, toward the achievement of a common goal.

A mix of advanced control and cognitive capabilities characterize the SHERPA system, aiming to support the rescuer by improving his awareness of the rescue scene even in tough environments and with the "genius" often "busy" in the rescuing activity (and thus unable to supervise the platform). Thus emphasis is placed on robust autonomy of the platform, acquisition of cognitive capabilities, collaboration strategies, natural and implicit interaction between the "genius" and the "SHERPA animals", which motivate the research activity.

ICARUS 

The introduction of unmanned Search and Rescue devices can offer a valuable tool to save human lives and to speed up the Search And Rescue (SAR) process. ICARUS concentrates on the development of unmanned SAR technologies for detecting, locating and rescuing humans.

There is a vast literature on research efforts towards the development of unmanned Search and Rescue tools. However, this research effort stands in contrast to the practical reality in the field, where unmanned search and rescue tools have great difficulty finding their way to the end-users.

The ICARUS project addresses these issues, aiming to bridge the gap between the Research community and end-users, by developing a toolbox of integrated components for unmanned Search and Rescue.

After the earthquakes in l’Aquila, Haiti and Japan, the European Commission confirmed that there exists a large discrepancy between (robotic) technology which is developed in laboratory and the use of such technology on the terrain for Search and Rescue (SAR) operations and crisis management. Thus, the European Commission's Directorate-General for Enterprise and Industry decided to fund ICARUS, a Research project (global budget: 17.5M€) which aims to develop robotic tools which can assist “human” crisis intervention teams.

DARPA Robotics Challenge (DRC) 

The Department of Defense's strategic plan calls for the Joint Force to conduct humanitarian, disaster relief, and related operations. Some disasters, due to grave risks to the health and wellbeing of rescue and aid workers, prove too great in scale or scope for timely and effective human response. The DARPA Robotics Challenge (DRC) seeks to address this problem by promoting innovation in human-supervised robotic technology for disaster-response operations.

The primary technical goal of the DRC is to develop human-supervised ground robots capable of executing complex tasks in dangerous, degraded, human-engineered environments. Competitors in the DRC are developing robots that can utilize standard tools and equipment commonly available in human environments, ranging from hand tools to vehicles.

To achieve its goal, the DRC is advancing the state of the art of supervised autonomy, mounted and dismounted mobility, and platform dexterity, strength, and endurance. Improvements in supervised autonomy, in particular, aim to enable better control of robots by non-expert supervisors and allow effective operation despite degraded communications (low bandwidth, high latency, intermittent connection).

R4 Program 

Fifteen scientists from all over the world were put together on a team of search and rescue professionals from the Federal Emergency Management Agency's Indiana. They were put together to find problems with rescue robots. Together they put together the R4 program. Which is Rescue Robots for Research and Response. This is a three-year grant and it is there to improve the rescue robot technology and human performance. Three robots were tested during this time and a fourth was introduced to the scientists. Each robot spent about an hour moving around in the rubble and was observed for their movement and how well they were able to make their way through the rubble. They tested the robots on the rubble from the World Trade Center disaster so they could better prepare for a similar disaster. They were looking for two things with these rescue robots. First, how to detect victims and unsafe conditions for rescuers in a highly cluttered, unfavorable environment. Second, how to ensure sensor coverage of a particular volume of space. In one series of tests, robots were put into dark, mine-like conditions. However, the robots were unable to locate half of their targets. Some changes will need to be made if they ever expect these robots to function properly. But once they figure out what they need they will hopefully serve a great purpose and be a greater asset to rescuers.

See also 
 Search and rescue
 Rescue robot competition

Further reading 
 Robin R. Murphy: Disaster Robotics. MIT Press, Cambridge 2014, .

References

External links 
 Center for Robot Assisted Search & Rescue